Nagatani Dam is a gravity dam located in Fukuoka Prefecture in Japan. The dam is used for water supply. The catchment area of the dam is 94.8 km2. The dam impounds about 33  ha of land when full and can store 4920 thousand cubic meters of water. The construction of the dam was started on 1978 and completed in 1993.

References

Dams in Fukuoka Prefecture
1993 establishments in Japan